{{Infobox settlement
| name                     = Cijin
| official_name            = Cijin District{{refn|group=Note|name=usage|Use of the term Cijin in various contexts:Academia: Domestic
Government: Central/ Municipal/ District International
Journalism: Domestic/ International}}
| native_name              = 
| native_name_lang         = zh-hant
| other_name               = Chichin, Qijin
| settlement_type          = District
| translit_lang1           = 
| translit_lang1_type      = 
| translit_lang1_info      = 
| image_skyline            = Kaohsiung Taiwan Cihou-Presbiterian-Church-02.jpg
| image_blank_emblem       = Cijin logo.png
| blank_emblem_type        = Cijin 
| imagesize                = 
| image_alt                = 
| image_caption            = 
| image_map                = Cijin KH.svg
| mapsize                  = 
| map_alt                  = 
| map_caption              = Cijin District in Kaohsiung City
| subdivision_type         = Country
| subdivision_name         = Taiwan
| subdivision_type1        = Region
| subdivision_name1        = Southern Taiwan
| subdivision_type2        = Special municipality
| subdivision_name2        = Kaohsiung
| named_for                = 
| seat_type                = 
| seat                     = 
| parts_type               = Divisions
| parts_style              = 
| parts                    = 
| p1                       = 
| p2                       = 
| government_footnotes     = 
| government_type          = 
| governing_body           = 
| leader_party             = 
| leader_title             = 
| leader_name              = 
| area_footnotes           = 
| area_total_km2           = 1.4639
| area_rank                = 37
| population_footnotes     = 
| population_total         = 26611
| population_as_of         = January 2023
| population_rank          = 26
| population_density_km2   = 18414
| postal_code_type         = Postal code
| postal_code              = 805
| website                  = 
| elevation_m              = 2
| elevation_ft             = 7
| utc_offset               = +8
| population_density_sq_mi = 47692
}}Cijin District (Hokkien POJ: Kî-tin-khu) is a district of Kaohsiung City, Taiwan, covering Cijin Island''' and islands in the South China Sea. It is the second smallest district in Kaohsiung City after Yancheng District, with an area of 1.4639 square kilometers, or 0.5652 square miles. It has a population of 26,611 as of January 2023, making it the 26th most populated district in Kaohsiung, with a population density of 18,414 people per square kilometer, or 47,692 people per square mile.

History

Cijin forms the original core of the Kaohsiung, which was established by the fisherman Hsu Ah-hua in the mid-17th century. He realized the attractiveness of the location when he was forced to seek shelter from a typhoon in the Taiwan Strait and returned with settlers from the Hung, Wang, Tsai, Lee, Pai, and Pan families and an idol of the Chinese sea goddess Ma-tsu. This was housed in a bamboo and thatch structure that formed the first Cijin Tianhou Temple. The town grew up around the temple grounds.

HMS Reynard was wrecked near Pratas Island on May 31, 1851.

Cijin Island was once connected to the mainland at the southern tip, but in 1967, this link was severed to create a second entry point to the Port of Kaohsiung.

Geography

Two islands and one reef in the South China Sea are administered by Kaohsiung City as part of the districts Zhongxing Village:
 Pratas Island on Dongsha Atoll
 Taiping Island
 Zhongzhou Reef

Administrative divisions

The district consists of Cisia (Qixia), Yongan, Jhensing (Zhenxing), Ciai, Fuxing, Zhonghua, Shijian, Beishan, Nanshan, Shangzhu, Zhongzhou, Anshun and Jhongsing (Zhongxing) Villages.

Government
The councilor for Cijin District in the Kaohsiung City Council is Lee Chiao-ju.

Economy
Most of its residents are employed by the shipping industry. There is a park on the north western shore.

Education

Universities 
 National Kaohsiung University of Science and Technology

Junior high schools 
 Kaohsiung Municipal Cijin Junior High School

Elementary schools 
 Kaohsiung Municipal Cijin Elementary School
 Kaohsiung Municipal Dashan Elementary School
 Kaohsiung Municipal Zhongzhou Elementary School

Tourist attractions
There are numerous tourist attractions in Cijin District.

Cijin Island proper 

 Cijin Old Street
 Cihou Market

 Cijin Tianhou Temple
 Cijin Lingshui Temple
 Cihou Fort
 Cijin Tunnel
 Mount Cihou
 Cijin Shell Museum
 Cijin Wind Turbine Park
 Cijin Beach
 Kaohsiung Lighthouse
 Rainbow Church
 War and Peace Memorial Park and Theme Hall
 YM Museum of Marine Exploration Kaohsiung

Outer Islands
Dongsha Atoll National Park
Taiping Cultural Park

Transportation

Cijin Island proper 

The "Cross Harbor Tunnel" connects Cijin Island at the southern tip of the island to the rest of Kaohsiung on mainland Taiwan. Cijin District is also accessible by two ferry piers, the Cijin Ferry Pier at the northern tip of the island and the Zhongzhou Ferry Pier at the middle of the island.

Outer Islands 
Dongsha Airport and Taiping Island Airport.

See also
 List of Taiwanese superlatives

Notes

References

External links 

 

Barrier islands
Districts of Kaohsiung